Roger Scotti (29 July 1925 – 12 December 2001) was a French footballer who played as a midfielder.

Career
Scotti spent his entire career with Olympique de Marseille. He also held the record for most games played under the Olympian colors: 453 match and competitions in all. Until he was passed by Steve Mandanda in 2018.

He played his first match for the France national team on 1 November 1950 against Belgium, and his final game was on 7 October 1956 against Hungary.

He was noted as friendly and sportsmanlike.

Honours 
Marseille
 French Division 1: 1947–48
 Coupe de France: 1942–43

Individual
 Player having the most worn jersey in the Olympique de Marseille: 452 matches combined.

References

fff.fr Profile in French
OMI 1899 Profile in English

1925 births
2001 deaths
French footballers
Footballers from Marseille
Association football forwards
France international footballers
Ligue 1 players
Olympique de Marseille players